Verin Getashen is a village in the Martuni Municipality of the Gegharkunik Province of Armenia, located just southwest of Lake Sevan. The village lies to the south of Nerkin Getashen. The village containts the St. Astvatsatsin and the St. Sargis churches.

History 
The village was founded 1828-29 by migrants from Mush and Alashkert, in present-day Eastern Turkey.

References

External links 
 
 

Populated places in Gegharkunik Province
Populated places established in 1828